Roscoe Turner Airport  is a public-use airport located four nautical miles (7 km) southwest of the central business district of Corinth, a city in Alcorn County, Mississippi, United States. It is owned by the City of Corinth and Alcorn County. This airport is included in the FAA's National Plan of Integrated Airport Systems for 2009–2013, which categorized it as a general aviation facility.

Facilities and aircraft 
It has one runway designated 18/36 with an asphalt surface measuring 6,500 by 100 feet (1,981 x 30 m).

For the 12-month period ending October 29, 2009, the airport had 16,400 aircraft operations, an average of 44 per day: 98% general aviation and 2% military. At that time there were 16 aircraft based at this airport: 62.5% single-engine, 25% multi-engine and 12.5% ultralight.

Accidents and incidents
 On December 24, 2015 a single engine plane, registered to North Mississippi Pulmonology Clinic in Booneville crashed onto County Road 504 just before 10:30am. Four people were on board the aircraft.  One was flown to a hospital in Memphis and the other three were sent to a local hospital in Corinth for observation.

References

External links 
 Aerial image as of 17 February 1996 from USGS The National Map
 
 

Airports in Mississippi
Buildings and structures in Alcorn County, Mississippi
Transportation in Alcorn County, Mississippi